Isabella Khairiah Hadid (born October 9, 1996) is an American model. In 2016, she was voted "Model of the Year" by industry professionals for Models.com. Over the span of four years, Hadid has made twenty-seven appearances on international Vogue magazine covers.

Born in Washington, D.C. and raised in Santa Barbara, California, Hadid began her modeling career at the age of 16. She was signed to IMG Models in August 2014, and made her New York Fashion Week debut the following month. In 2017, Hadid broke Doutzen Kroes's record for the most Vogue September covers in one year by appearing in five international editions (China, Spain, Brazil, Australia and Arabia).

Early life
Isabella Khairiah Hadid was born on October 9, 1996, in Washington, D.C. Her father, Mohamed Hadid, is a Palestinian Jordanian real estate developer, while her mother, Yolanda Hadid (née van den Herik), is a Dutch former model. Through her father, Hadid claims descent from Daher Al Omer, Prince of Nazareth and Sheik of Galilee. She has an older sister, Gigi, and a younger brother, Anwar, both of whom are also models. She also has two older paternal half-sisters; Marielle and Alana. Hadid and her siblings were raised on a ranch in Santa Barbara, California. The family moved to Beverly Hills after ten years.

As a teenager, Hadid was an equestrian and dreamed of competing at the 2016 Summer Olympics, although she competed in equitation, which is not an Olympic discipline. She was diagnosed, along with her mother and brother, with chronic lyme disease in 2012.

After graduating from Malibu High School in 2014, Hadid moved to New York City to study photography at the Parsons School of Design. She suspended her studies to focus on her modeling career, but has expressed an interest in returning to school once she's done modeling to branch out into fashion photography. Hadid has also expressed an interest in acting.

Career

2012–2014: Early work 
Hadid's modeling career began when she was sixteen years old with a commercial project for Flynn Skye. She also appeared in modeling projects such as Lesa Amoore's "The Swan Settings", alongside actor Ben Barnes, and Holly Copeland's "Smoking Hot". Hadid also modeled for Hanna Hayes' Fall/Winter 2013 Collection, and did campaign work for Chrome Hearts, the family brand of her best friend, Jesse Jo Stark.

2014–2015: Rise to prominence 
Hadid signed to IMG Models on August 21, 2014. She made her New York Fashion Week debut in September, walking for Desigual. In December, Hadid made her first cover appearance on Jalouse Magazine, and was featured on day 27 of LOVE Magazine Love Advent Calendar.

In February 2015, Hadid made her runway debut, walking for Tom Ford's Fall/Winter 2015 collection. In April, she was featured in two editions of Carine Roitfeld's CR Fashion Book – "Body By Bella" and "Fantasy Campaigns". In May, she walked for amfAR's 22nd Cinema Against AIDS Gala.

In the spring, she was featured in a campaign for Botkier Bags. In August, she starred in Victoria's Secret Pink Holiday campaign, alongside models Rachel Hilbert and Devon Windsor. In the fall, she was featured in a campaign for Boghossian Jewelry. In late 2015, at New York Fashion Week, Hadid walked for Diane von Fürstenberg, Tommy Hilfiger, Marc Jacobs, and closed Jeremy Scott's show. At London Fashion Week, she walked for Topshop Unique and Giles. At Milan Fashion Week, she walked for Philipp Plein, Moschino, Missoni, and Bottega Veneta. At Paris Fashion Week, she walked for Balmain. In December 2015, she made her Chanel debut, walking for the first time for Métiers d'Art in Rome.

She appeared on the November 2015 cover of Seventeen. She also starred in Topshop's Holiday campaign, along with eight models, and was featured again on days 14 and 15 of LOVE Magazine Love Advent Calendar. She and her sister, Gigi, appeared in Balmain's Fall 2015 campaign.  and the Fall 2015 ad campaign for Ralph Lauren Denim & Supply. She co-starred in Samsung's Fall/Winter Look Book with Xiao Wen Ju, which incorporated both technology and fashion.

During 2015, Hadid shot editorials for several magazines, including Vogue Australia, Vogue Girl Japan, Harper's Bazaar, GQ, W Magazine, Town and Country, Pop Magazine, Glamour Magazine, and Elle. She also appeared on the covers of Unconditional Magazine, Grey Magazine, V Magazine (with sister, Gigi), Editorialist, Wonderland 10th Birthday Issue, S Moda, Evening Standard, Teen Vogue, and Twin Magazine Fall/Winter Issue.

2016–2017: Breakthrough 
In January 2016, Hadid made her Chanel Couture debut during Paris Haute Couture Spring/Summer Fashion Week. She also starred in Marc Jacobs' campaign, "My America". In February, she walked for Fenty x Puma at New York Fashion Week. She walked exclusively for Givenchy, Chanel, and Miu Miu at their shows at Paris Fashion Week in March. She also starred in Joe's Jeans Spring 2016 campaign. In May, she made her Australian Fashion Debut at Mercedes-Benz Fashion Week, exclusively opening and closing the Misha Collection Resort 17 show. She also walked for amfAR's 23rd Cinema Against AIDS Gala and Dior Cruise 2017 in London.

On May 31, 2016, Hadid became an ambassador for Dior Makeup. She starred in a web series from the fashion house called Dior Makeup with Bella Hadid, and did a tutorial using their makeup for American Vogue YouTube channel. In June, she walked Givenchy's Menswear Fall 2016 campaign in Haute Couture during Paris Fashion Week. In July, she walked for Versace, Dior, and closed the show for Alexandre Vauthier. She then closed the show for Fendi's Haute Couture campaign in Rome.

Hadid started off the Spring/Summer 2017 season during New York Fashion Week, opening for DKNY and walking for Michael Kors, Anna Sui, Ralph Lauren, and Marc Jacobs.

During London Fashion Week, she exclusively opened for Versus (Versace). During Milan Fashion Week, she opened shows for Alberta Ferretti and Fendi, walked for Max Mara, Moschino, Versace and Bottega Veneta, and closed for Philosophy di Lorenzo Serafini. She also starred in Topshop's Denim campaign. In June, she was featured in Givenchy's Fall/Winter campaign. In July, alongside Frank Ocean, Kate Moss, and others, she was featured in the Calvin Klein Fall/Winter campaign. In August, she starred in J.W. Anderson's Fall/Winter campaign. She also photographed her close friends, the Stark family, for W Magazine. In October, she starred in Misha Collection's campaign, "Gold by Misha".  On November 30, she made her Victoria's Secret Fashion Show debut. On December 13, she announced her first clothing line with longtime friend and partner, Chrome Hearts.

During 2016, she appeared on the covers of Seventeen Mexico, Self Service Magazine, CR Fashion Book "#CRGirls", V Magazine, Harper's Bazaar (Spain, Japan, Australia and Russia), Elle (Brazil, United States, United Kingdom, Thailand, Indonesia and Malaysia), Allure, Double Magazine, Glamour (Germany, United States, Russia, Hungary, Romania, Bulgaria, Turkey and Iceland), Exit Magazine, W Magazine Korea, L'Officiel Russia, Sunday Times Style, British GQ, Flare, and Paper Magazine. In May, Hadid scored her first Vogue cover for Vogue Turkey, and made her short film debut in Tyler Ford's film, Private. In August, she appeared on the cover of Vogue Me with Korean rapper G-Dragon. In September, she appeared in three more Vogue covers for Japan, Italia, and Paris, alongside model Taylor Hill. She was also the star of LOVE Magazine 2016 Advent Calendar.

In January 2017, Hadid walked in Givenchy's Fall/Winter Menswear campaign in Paris. She also walked for Chanel and opened the show for Alexandre Vauthier. In February, she became an ambassador for Bulgari's accessory line and TAG Heuer. She walked in her sister, Gigi's, Tommy Hilfiger collaboration show, Tommy x Gigi, in Los Angeles, and closed the H&M Studio show in Paris. Both appearances were last minute additions to the season. During New York Fashion Week, she opened shows for Prabal Gurung and Zadig & Voltaire, walked for Alexander Wang, Sies Marjan, Carolina Herrera, Brandon Maxwell, Michael Kors, Anna Sue and Ralph Lauren, and closed for Oscar de la Renta. During London Fashion Week, she was the exclusive opener of the show for Versace Versus.

In Milan, she walked for Alberta Ferretti, Fendi, Moschino, and Versace. To close out the season, in Paris, she walked for Lanvin, Chanel, Alexandre Vauthier, and opened the show for Off-White. While appearing at the Cannes Film Festival, she walked for Naomi Campbell's Fashion for Relief show and for amfAR's Cinema Against AIDS Gala. For Haute Couture week, she opened for Alexandre Vauthier, and walked for Miu Miu Resort, Maison Margiela and Fendi.

Hadid and her sister, Gigi, started off the Spring/Summer season together by starring in Fendi and Moschino campaigns. She also shot a campaign for Zadig & Voltaire with her younger brother, Anwar. She appeared solo for DKNY, TAG Heuer, and Boghossian campaigns. She also starred in Ochirly's Spring and Summer campaign and in Zayn x Versus' collection campaign. She starred in her first beauty campaign for Dior Makeup's "Pump N' Volume" mascara. She shot her first campaign with Nike for the Nike Cortez. She starred as the face of Bulgari's Goldea Roman Night fragrance and the Serpiniti collection. She shot a second accessories campaign for Max Mara, and starred in Penshoppe's "Generation" campaign. During the season, she starred alongside Miles McMillan in Giuseppe Zanotti, Justin Grossman in NARS Cosmetics, and Kendall Jenner in Ochirly's Fall campaign.

Hadid's first cover of 2017 was a reprint of her editorial from W Magazine United States. It was reprinted for the January issue of W Magazine Korea. Her first new cover of the year was for Teen Vogue, appearing with her best friend, Jesse Jo Stark. In April, she appeared on the cover of Vogue China. In June, she starred on the cover of Vogue Italia. In September, Hadid topped her numbers from the year prior with Elle Russia and Harper's Bazaar China. She also broke the record for most Vogue September covers in one year (formerly kept by Doutzen Kroes in 2013 and Linda Evangelista in 1993), by appearing in five international editions: China, Spain, Brazil, Australia, and Arabia. She also appeared on the cover of CR Fashion Book, Grazia, Sunday Times Style, Porter Magazine, ELLE (United States, China, Russia and France), InStyle, and 032c.

She also shot editorials for Vogue Paris, LOVE Magazine, V Magazine, and Dazed.

2018–present: Further recognition 
In January 2018, Hadid appeared on the cover of Vogue Korea. In March, she starred on the cover of British Vogue with her sister, Gigi. In May, she appeared on the cover of Vogue Japan. In July, she starred on the covers of Cosmopolitan Germany, Harper's Bazaar and Vogue México. In September, she starred on the covers of Allure and Pop Magazine. In October, she appeared on the cover of Harper's Bazaar Arabia. For the Fall 2018 season, Hadid opened for Off-White at Paris Fashion Week. In Milan, she walked for Tommy Hilfiger, Missoni, Roberto Cavalli, Tod's, Fendi, Moschino, Alberta Ferretti and Max Mara. In New York, she walked for Michael Kors, Anna Sui, Ralph Lauren, Prabal Gurung, Brandon Maxwell and Jason Wu. On November 8, she walked the Victoria's Secret Fashion Show for a third time.

In February 2019, at Paris Fashion Week, Hadid walked for Redemption, Haider Ackerman and Off-White. In Milan, she walked for Versace, Missoni, Philosophy Di Lorenzo Serafini, Max Mara, Fendi, Versace, Alberta Ferretti, Moschino and Roberto Cavalli. She then walked for CR Runway's 90th Anniversary show alongside models Irina Shayk and Joan Smalls. In New York, she walked for Oscar de la Renta, Michael Kors, Brandon Maxwell and Savage x Fenty. In March, she starred on the cover of Vogue Russia. In April, she starred on the cover of Vogue Greece. In June, she appeared on the covers of Vogue Japan and Vogue España. She made a second appearance on Vogue Japan cover in July. In June, she appeared on the cover of ELLE France.

In February 2020, at New York Fashion Week, Hadid walked for Tom Ford, Brandon Maxwell, Oscar de la Renta, Rodarte, Khaite and Michael Kors. She also walked for Marc Jacobs' Fall campaign. In Paris, she walked for Thierry Mugler and Lanvin. In Milan, she walked for Boss, Missoni, Versace, Tod's, Moschino, Fendi, Max Mara and Alberta Ferretti. She also appeared on the cover of Vogue Hong Kong. In April, she appeared on the covers of Vogue Korea and Vogue Greece. In June, she appeared on the cover of Vogue Paris, with her sister, Gigi. In August, she starred on the cover of ELLE. Her editorial was shot by her older sister. In September, she appeared on the cover of Vogue Italia. In December, she starred for the cover of Vogue Japan.

In February 2021, Hadid walked for Givenchy's Fall campaign. In March, she walked for Mugler's Spring/Summer virtual campaign and appeared in Boss x Russell Athletics' campaign. She also appeared on the cover of Vogue España. In May, she walked for Versace's AW21 show. In June, during Paris Fashion Week, she walked for Jacquemus' show, "La Montagne". In July at the Cannes Film Festival, her Maison Schiaparelli haute couture gown cut low and wide to expose her bare chest attracted considerable coverage. At Paris fashion Week 2022, Hadid closed Coperni’s Spring 2023 show by having a slip dress spray-painted directly onto her body using Fabrican technology.

Other ventures 
On September 1, 2021, Hadid became the co-founder and business partner of Kin Euphorics, a nonalcoholic adaptogenic beverage brand. She oversees the company alongside its CEO and founder Jen Batchelor.

Hadid made her acting debut as a guest role in the third season of Ramy.

Philanthropy 

In November 2018, for Thanksgiving, she volunteered to help make 500 meals for the Bowery Mission on behalf of System of Service, Hashtag Lunch Bag, and Nike.

In April and May 2020, Hadid announced that she made a donation to local food banks in New York City and to Feeding America to support COVID-19 relief. In May, she announced she will be supporting and donating to charities such as Preemptive Love, UNRWA USA and Middle East Children's Alliance (MECA) to help support refugees.

Hadid has shown support for the Black Lives Matter movement. When protests resurged in May 2020, Hadid announced that she would be donating to the NAACP Legal Defense Fund. In June, Hadid auctioned off her Miu Miu boots as a part of a charity auction organized by British Vogue that benefitted NHS Charities Together and the NAACP.

In July, Hadid auctioned off clothing designs that she has created at home during the COVID-19 lockdown, with all of the proceeds going towards organizations such as Your Rights Camp and Feeding America. In August, following an explosion in Beirut, Lebanon, she announced that she will be donating to thirteen charities in Lebanon.

In September, Hadid donated some of her clothes to a sidewalk sale in Brooklyn that benefitted organizations such as Abundant Beginnings Collective and Brooklyn Supported Agriculture.

Personal life

Legal issues 
On July 22, 2014, Hadid was arrested and charged with a DUI. Her driver's license was suspended for one year and she was given six months of probation.  Hadid was also ordered to perform 25 hours of community service and attend 20 hours of Alcoholics Anonymous meetings.

Relationships 
From April 2015 to August 2019, Hadid was in an on-again, off-again relationship with Canadian singer-songwriter The Weeknd. She starred in the music video for his single "In the Night" in December 2015. Their relationship received widespread media attention, and was the topic of tabloid speculation.

In July 2020, Hadid began dating art director Marc Kalman. Their relationship was made public on July 8, 2021, during her time at Paris Fashion Week and the Cannes Film Festival.

Religion and politics 
When discussing her opposition to President Trump's immigration policies in 2017, Hadid shared during an interview with Porter that she is "proud to be a Muslim" while reflecting on her father's history as a refugee. In March 2022, during a cover story with American Vogue, Hadid revealed that she lives a spiritual lifestyle, and although her family wasn't religious, she grew up learning about Judaism and is interested in Islam. "I'm very spiritual, and I find that I connect with every religion," she explained. "There's that my-way-is-the-right-way thing in human nature, but for me it's not about my god or your god. I kind of just call on whoever is willing to be there for me."

In January 2017, Hadid attended the "No Ban, No Wall" march in New York City, saying in an interview it was her own family history that drove her to participate in the march: "I come from a really diverse background. I've had incredible experiences all over the world… and I've learned that we're all just people, and we all deserve respect and kindness. We shouldn't treat people as if they don't deserve kindness just because of their ethnicities. It's just not right." On December 8, Hadid joined protests in London against Trump's decision to move the U.S. embassy in Israel and recognize Jerusalem as the capital of Israel.

Awards and nominations
In March 2016, Hadid won "Model of the Year" at the Daily Front Row Fashion Los Angeles Awards. In June 2016, Hadid ranked among Models.com's Top 50 Models. In September, she won "Model of the Year" at the GQ Men of the Year Awards in London. In December, Models.com nominated Hadid for their Reader's Choice awards for "Model of the Year" and "Social Media Star of the Year". She was voted "Model of the Year" by industry professionals.

Filmography

Television

Short films

Dior Beauty with Bella Hadid

Music videos

References

External links 

Bella Hadid at Models.com

1996 births
American Muslims
American Sunni Muslims
American female equestrians
American female models
American people of Dutch descent
American people of Palestinian descent
Female models from California
Female models from New York (state)
Female models from Washington, D.C.
Bella
Living people
Models from Los Angeles
Parsons School of Design alumni
IMG Models models
Muslim models
21st-century American women
21st-century Muslims